Zenon Andrusyshyn (born February 25, 1947) is a German-Canadian former Canadian Football League (CFL) punter and kicker from –, –, primarily for the Toronto Argonauts. He also was a member of the Kansas City Chiefs in the National Football League (NFL) and the Tampa Bay Bandits in the United States Football League (USFL). He played college football at UCLA.

Early years
Andrusyshyn was born in Germany to Ukrainian parents. His family moved to Ontario, Canada where he attended Oakville Trafalgar High School. He set a high school javelin record that lasted for 35 years. Andrusyshyn participated with the Canadian team in the javelin throw, shot put and discus during the 1966 British Empire and Commonwealth Games. He held the Canadian javelin record with a throw of 242 feet 6 inches.

He received a track and field scholarship from UCLA to compete in the javelin throw, but suffered an elbow injury while preparing for the 1968 Summer Olympics and decided to walk-on to the football team after kicking in a tryout 14 field goals in a row from 45 yards out. In one practice he kicked field goals of 57 and 62 yards. Andrusyshyn was used both as a punter and placekicker. 

As a sophomore, he led the NCAA in punting with a 44.2 average and also made 11 of 24 field goal attempts. Against the University of Southern California in a contest that was called "the game of the century", he missed one field goal, had two blocked, and failed a critical extra point that gave them the victory and the eventual 1967 National championship. Then USC head coach John McKay, remarked that "Andrusyshyn kicks with low leverage," and that is why he employed 6-foot-8 offensive tackle Bill Hayhoe to affect his kicking game.

As a senior, he made 8 of 12 field goals, 33 of 44 extra points and had a 42.1-yard punting average. He was a two-time All-American punter (1967, 1969) and was voted to UCLA's All Century Team.

Professional career

Dallas Cowboys
Andrusyshyn was selected by the Dallas Cowboys in the ninth round (231st overall) of the 1970 NFL Draft. He was waived before the start of the season on September 2.

Toronto Argonauts (first stint)
On May 5, 1971, he signed as a free agent with the Toronto Argonauts of the Canadian Football League. On October 23, 1977, he recorded a 108-yard punt against the Edmonton Eskimos, which still stands as the longest punt in professional football history.

Kansas City Chiefs
On April 14, 1978, he signed as a free agent with the Kansas City Chiefs. He was named the team's starting punter, registering 79 punts for 3,247 yards (41.1-yard avg.), a long of 61 yards and one blocked punt. On August 21, 1979, he was waived after being passed on the depth chart by Bob Grupp.

Hamilton Tiger-Cats
On September 7, 1979, he was signed as a free agent by the Hamilton Tiger-Cats of the Canadian Football League. He appeared in the last 8 games handling both the punting and kicking roles. He made 10 of 20 field goals, 15 of 16 extra points and averaged 43.2 yards on 51 punts. On June 15, 1980, he was traded to the Toronto Argonauts in exchange for offensive lineman Al MacLean.

Toronto Argonauts (second stint)
In 1980, he was named the starting kicker and punter over Ian Sunter. He was named CFL East All-Star in two straight seasons. On September 14, 1980, against the Saskatchewan Roughriders, he kicked a career-longest 57-yard field goal. He was passed on the depth chart by Dean Dorsey and was released in September 1982.

Edmonton Eskimos
In September 1982, he was claimed off waivers by the Edmonton Eskimos to replace Hank Ilesic, who walked out in a contract dispute.

Tampa Bay Bandits
On December 29, 1982, he signed as a free agent with the Tampa Bay Bandits of the United States Football League. He was the starter at kicker and punter for three seasons until the team folded in 1986.

Montreal Alouettes
On October 1, 1986, he signed as a free agent with the Montreal Alouettes to replace an injured Roy Kurtz. He wasn't re-signed after the season.

Personal life
Andrusyshyn met his wife on the television show The Dating Game in 1969. That year, he also had a small part in the television show Medical Center.

He was ordained a minister in the Southern Baptist denomination in 1990 in Nashville, Tennessee. He also graduated from Dallas Theological Seminary in 1995 with a Master in Arts, Biblical Studies (MABS).

He was the Fellowship of Christian Athletes Tampa Area Director from March 1987, completing 20 years with FCA in 2007. In October 2007, Zenon Andrusyshyn formed his own ministry with his wife Sue. Known as Zenon Ministries Inc., it is a 501(c)(3) non-profit youth ministry. Andrusyshyn has been on over 15 mission trips which includes delivering medical supplies to Cuna Indians- Panama (three times), to Cancer Hospitals for Children in Kyiv and Odessa, Ukraine (four times), Missions abroad in England (three times), Germany (three times) and Mexico (three times). He served as Youth Chairman for the Billy Graham Crusade-1998 Tampa, Florida, and as Youth Chairman for Luis Palau's TampaBayFest 2007.

References

External links
UCLA's Zenon Andrusyshyn kick-started his life after 1967 loss to USC
Retro Profile: Zenon Andrusyshyn
CFL bio

1947 births
Living people
American football placekickers
American football punters
Canadian football placekickers
Canadian football punters
Canadian people of Ukrainian descent
Canadian male javelin throwers
Canadian male shot putters
Canadian male discus throwers
Canadian players of American football
Edmonton Elks players
Hamilton Tiger-Cats players
Kansas City Chiefs players
Montreal Alouettes players
Southern Baptist ministers
Tampa Bay Bandits players
Toronto Argonauts players
UCLA Bruins football players
Athletes (track and field) at the 1966 British Empire and Commonwealth Games
Commonwealth Games competitors for Canada
Track and field athletes in the National Football League
People from Günzburg
Sportspeople from Swabia (Bavaria)